The Theban Tomb TT41 is located in Sheikh Abd el-Qurna, part of the Theban Necropolis, on the west bank of the Nile, opposite to Luxor. It is the burial place of the ancient Egyptian Amenemopet called Ipy, whose title was Chief Steward of Amun in the Southern City. He dates to the time of Ramesses I, Sethi I and Ramesses II from the Nineteenth Dynasty of Egypt

Amenemopet called Ipy was the son of a judge named Nefertiu and his wife Iny (or Aniy), who was a songstress of the Theban Triad. Amenemopet called Ipy's wife was named Nedjemet, a chantress of Amun, born of the Chantress of Amun Maya. Further titles of Amenhotep called Ipy include Superintendent of the Granary of the North and the South, Superintendent of the prophets of Min and Isis, and  Majordomo of the God’s Wife.

See also
 List of Theban tombs

References

Theban tombs
Nineteenth Dynasty of Egypt